The Tale about Baba-Yaga is a Russian fairy tale first published in a late 18th-century compilation of fairy tales.

Summary
In a distant kingdom, a woman named Baba Yaga, bony-legged, has an only son of virtuous character. He marries a human girl. She begins to despise her daughter-in-law and plots to kill her someway or other.

While her son is away, Baba Yaga begs with false kindness for the girl to go the woods and milk her cows. The girl walks toward the cow pen, but her husband intercepts her in time, and reveals that the "cows" are, in fact, bears that will kill her. Baba Yaga's son then suggests she milks some mares and give tit to Baba Yaga.

The next day, Baba Yaga asks the girl to shear her sheep in the woods. Her husband appears again and tells her that the "sheep" are wolves that will tear her to pieces, so he teaches her a magic command. The girl climbs up a tree, chants the magical command and the wolves shear themselves.

Seeing the girl's newfound success, Baba Yaga then sends her to Baba Yaga's sister with a request for a reed for weaving. The girl meets her husband, who gives her oil, lard, needles and pins, as well as a comb, a tablecloth, a brush and a ring. The girl begins her journey: she oils the hinges of a door; gives pieces of ham to two dogs; gives lard to a cat and needles and pins to a group of girls. The human girl asks Baba Yaga's sister for the reed. Baba Yaga's sister lets her have the reed, while she goes to prepare the bathhouse. 

The group of girls warn the human that the witch is planning to devour her, so she must take the reed and escape. The human takes the reed and flees from the house. Baba Yaga's sister enters the house and, noticing the girl's absence, complains that the female servants, the cat, the dogs and door have not stopped her, and flies away on her mortar behind her.

Realizing that she is being pursued by the witch, the human girl throws behind the comb, the tablecloth, the brush and the ring to create magic obstacles to hinder the pursuit. The human girl delivers the reed to Baba Yaga, who warms up to her daughter-in-law.

Analysis

Tale type
Russian scholarship classifies the tale as type 428, "Девушка на службе у ведьмы" ("The Girl in the Witch's Service" or "A girl serving a Witch"), of the East Slavic Folktale Classification. According to scholar Andreas John, in the East Slavic type, the heroine's mother-in-law (sometimes identified as witch Baba Yaga) sends her on dangerous tasks in order to get rid of her, but, with her husband's advice, she prevails.

Variants
The East Slavic Folktale Catalogue, last updated by Russian folklorist  in 1979, registers 12 variants. Karelian and Russian scholarship agree that the paucity of registers indicates the "rarity" of this tale type.

Russia
Russian folklorist  published a Russian tale titled "Сноха" ("The Daughter-in-Law"). In this tale, a couple have a son. Their son marries a girl and the youth's mother sends the daughter-in-law to shear the sheep (actually, bears), then to milk the cows (who are wolves), and finally to her own sister to get a reed for weaving. After the girl goes to her mother-in-law's sister's house, she spits at the four corners of the room, while the witch is sharpening her teeth. She seizes the opportunity to give the cat a piece of butter and the dog a piece of meat, guide a deer into the pen, and sprinkle water on a door and close it. The girl takes the reed and flees - the tale ends.

Khudyakov collected a second variant titled "Опять Сноха" ("The Daughter-in-Law, Again"): a father has three daughters, and one day is drafted to war. His youngest daughter offers to go in his place, and wears the disguise of a male soldier. She is tested about her gender (like going to bathe in the river), but is eventually unmasked and marries a man. The man's mother-in-law forces the heroine in dangerous tasks: to shear her gray sheep (who are gray wolves), then to go to the barn and milk her brown cows (who are bears), and lastly to get a reed from her "sister". The heroine's husband warns her that his mother's "sister" is not a relative, but the witch Baba Yaga, who will devour her, so he gives her a piece of butter, a comb and a brush. The heroine visits Baba Yaga in her chicken-legged hut and asks for the reed for her mother-in-law. Baba Yaga goes to sharpen her teeth. The heroine gives the piece of butter to a cat. The animal, in return, advises the girl to spit under the porch, so her saliva can answer for her, then take the reed and escape. The girl obeys the cat and flees from Baba Yaga's hut. The witch goes after her on her iron mortar, but the girl throws behind her the comb and the brush to create obstacles for her. The tale was translated into German language by author August von Löwis de Menar with the title Die Mädchen als Soldat ("The Girl as Soldier").

In a variant from Samarskago Kraya with the title "Иван Агич и Василиса Васильевна" ("Ivan Agich and Vasilisa Vasilievna"), a father has three daughters and is drafted to a war, despite his age. His three daughters offer to go in his place, and the father tests them: as each of the girls try to begin their journeys, their father turns into a wolf to scare them; the two get scared and go back home, but the youngest, named Vasilisa Vasilievna, defeats the wolf and joins the army. In the army, she assumes the male identity of Vasily Vasilyevich, and becomes friends with a man named Ivan Agich, son of Baba Yaga. After the army, Vasilisa Vasilievna returns home. He father wants to gift their daughters with a present, and the youngest asks for little birds. Vasilisa Vasilievna feeds the birds, which take them to Ivan Agich across the Volga River. Ivan Agich and Vasilisa Vasilievna marry, but his mother, Baba Yaga, despises her. One day, Baba Yaga orders the girl to milk her cows (which are in fact bears). The next day, the witch sends the daughter-in-law to feed their geese, which are snakes. Lastly, Baba Yaga sends her daughter-in-law to her sister, named Yagaya Baba, with a letter containing an order to devour her. Ivan Agich advises his wife: she will pass by a splashing well that she is to throw a hook into; then, she needs to grease the door with butter; pass by a broom and place it under the threshold; give meat to his aunt's cats; give iron needles to his aunt's servants who use straw needles to weave. Vasilisa Vasilievna follows his instructions and asks his aunt for the reed. Yagaya Baba retires to her room to sharpen her teeth, while the girl takes the reed and escapes. Yagaya Baba returns and, not seeing the girl, scolds and beats the servants, the cat, the broom, the door and the well. Vasilisa Vasilievna returns with the reed. Baba Yaga feels anger at her success, but Ivan Agich stands up to his mother and takes his wife to regions unknown.

In a tale from Krasnoyarsk Krai - titled "Василиса Васильевна" by the compiler - a girl named Vasilisa Vasilievna tells her father she will serve in the army, and she goes to enlist. She joins the army under the male name Vasily Vasilyevich, but Baba Yaga suspects she is a woman in man's clothing. Baba Yaga sends her son with Vasily Vasilyevich to the bath house for a steam bath in the sauna - a trick to unmask her gender. Vasilisa tricks Baba Yaga's son and takes a quick bath. Later, she shows him her breasts to prove her identity. Baba Yaga's son says he wants her, but she returns home. Back home, Vasilisa asks her father to buy her a bed of swans and geese. On the first night, she feeds the geese, but not the swans; on the second, she feeds the swans, but not the geese; on the third night, she feeds none of the birds, and they take her to Baba Yaga's lair. Vasilisa tosses her ring in the sea and makes a vow not to utter a word to the witch while she is at Baba Yaga's house. Some time later, she is ordered to milk Baba Yaga's cows. A black-haired girl suddenly appears and helps Vasilisa. She reveals the "cows" are in fact bears. Next, Baba Yaga orders her to shear the sheep - which are really wolves. Lastly, the witch sends her to her sister to ask for a "berda". The dark-haired girl advises Vasilisa: she warns that a birch tree will beat her with a broom; rusty door will creak to alert her; and wolves, bears and dogs who will eat her. So the dark-haired girl gives Vasilisa some money and she buys a ribbon, pins, oil and meat. Vasilisa ties the ribbon on the birth tree; oils the doors; throws the pins and meat to the animals and greets Baba Yaga's sister. The witch's sister goes to another room to sharpen her teeth; the mice give Vasilisa a reed and she flees back to Baba Yaga's house. At the end of the tale, Vasilisa catches and opens the fish that swallowed her ring.

Russian philologist  collected a tale from informant Elisaveta Ivanovna Sidorova, from Tersky region, in the White Sea. In this tale, titled "Василиса Прекрасная" ("Beautiful Vasilisa"), a peasant couple ask his three daughters which will go to work for the Barkhat-Tsarevich ("Velvet Prince"). The youngest offers to go, and disguises herself in male clothes. The Velvet Prince discusses with his mother if their new companion is male or female, and they devise tests: to sleep a certain way on bed; to take a bath, She later returns to her father. Her father wants to bring presents for his daughters, and the youngest asks for a bed with four doves. Her father does not find this gift for whole two years, only on the third. The girl gets the four-dove bed, but does not feed them and the birds carry her back to the Velvet Prince. She notices she is back in his house, glues her ring to a wall and makes a vow not to speak until moss grows over it. She marries the Velvet Prince and his mother orders her on tasks. The first task is for her to shear the sheep. Her husband, the Velvet Prince, warns her that it is a ploy to kill her, but teaches her a magical command to summon the animals of the forest to get their fur. The next task is for her to go to her mother-in-law's aunt to get a "бёрдом" (a reed for weaving). Her husband advises her to buy a donkey, two ribbons, a piece of meat, two whitefishes and tar. The girl goes to the aunt's house: she walks through two smashing mountains on a donkey; passes by two gates and greases them with tar, gives a piece of meat to a dog, enters the house and ties a ribbon to two brooms, and throws the whitefish for the cats. While the aunt is away sharpening her teeth in another room, she gets the reed and escapes. The aunt scolds the animals and objects and is crushed by the two mountains. The last task is for the girl to go to the fiery river and get some white clay. Her husband advises the girl to buy some wine and bread, go to the margin of the river, summon the Noguiptitsa (Noguy-bird) with the iron nose, give it the wine and bread and ask for the white clay. At the end of the tale, the girl retrieves her moss-covered ring. 

In a tale titled "Как Василиса на войну поехала" ("How Vasilisa went to war"), a couple have three daughters, the youngest named Vasilisa. One day, their father is drafted to war against a neighbouring kingdom. The man's three daughters decide to fight in their father's stead. To test their courage, the man disguises himself as a creature and waits by the bridge. The elder daughters, dressed in masculine clothes, ride a horse and try to cross the bridge, but their father, in his monster disguise, scares them away. When it is the youngest's turn, Vasilisa simply strikes the "monster" with a whip traverses the bridge. Vasilisa rides to a three-way crossoads, and chooses the middle path. She rides until she finds a hut where a forest shishiga (a kind of witch) lives with her son Vanyushka and a little dog named Vikushka. The girl tells her name is Vasily-Vasey, and needs to go to war, but the shishiga tries to convince her to stay with them as a companion for her son. The shishiga and her son argue if their guest is male or female, and try to set tests for her: they place some herbs on her bed, and if they bloom, she is a girl; if she fetches water with a yoke, instead of a bucket, she is a girl. During the second test, Vanyushka confesses to Vasily-Vasey that the shishiga is not his mother, but that his own parents, when he was little, cursed aloud for the shishiga to take him, and it did happen. He also explains that a beautiful girl could save him from the shishiga. Either awy, they set a third task: to join him for a bath in the bath house. Vasilisa takes a quick bath, before she arises any suspicions. Later that night, Vasilisa decides to run away from the house, but the dog Vikushka advises her to take some porridge and some millet with her. She then departs with the horse, and stops to rest by a meadow. Back to the shishiga, Vanyushka notices his friend fled, and wants to go after him, but the shishiga commands her swan-geese to find Vasily-Vasey and bring him back. Vasilisa sees the flock, and drops some porridge and millet for the birds to distract them. The flock returns empty-handed, and the shishiga sends them back. The flock fly back to Vasilisa, now with her braids showing, and bring her to the witch. Vanyushka sees the girl and is happy, but the shishiga, fearing the girl will take her son from her, locks Vanyushka in the bath house and begins to boss Vasilisa around. The first task is for Vasilisa to milk the shishiga's "cows". The little dog intercepts Vasilisa and teaches her how to do it: leave the pail on the grass, climb a tree and let the she-bears come. The second task is for her to shear the sheep. Just like the first task, the little dog instructs her: she is to leave the shears on the ground, climb a stump, chant a spell for the stump to rise and let the wolves shear themselves. The shishiga, then, gives Vasilisa a stone spindle and forces her to spin it nonstop. Luckily, Vasilisa sings a song that lulls the witch to sleep. The little dog runs to fetch the keys to the bathhouse so she can release Vanyushka. Vasilisa uses her spit in her place to trick the shishiga, and takes with her a comb, some wolf hair and the stone spindle. When morning comes, the witch notices that the girl and her son are not there, and chases after them. During the chase, dog Vikushka alerts the pair about the witch coming for them, so they throw behind them the comb (which becomes a palisade), the wolf hair (which turns into a pack of wolves) and the stone spindle (which they crack in half). The obstacles manage to delay the pursuit, and the pair escape out of the woods. Vasilisa and Vanyuhska ride her horse to a nearby village, where they learn the war is over. Without a reason to  so Vasilisa takes Vanyushka with her to her parents.

One variant of the tale type has been collected in "Priangarya" (Irkutsk Oblast), in East Siberia.

Zaonezh'ya
In a tale from  titled "Как свекрова невесток переводила", a rich merchant talks to his wife that their son needs to be married. They find him a wife. While the merchant and his son go away on business, the woman asks her daughter-in-law to shear some wolves. The girl goes to the fields and wolves attack her. Her son comes back from the journey and asks about her, but his mother lies that she went for a stroll and never came back. The same "incident" happens to a second daughter-in-law. The son marries a third time and goes on a business trip. His mother asks her newest daughter-in-law to shear the sheep. This time, the girl talks to her own aunt, who tells her that they don't even have sheep, but ferocious wolves, and advises her to climb a tree, wait for the wolves to attack each other, get some of their fur, and run back home. Next, the woman sends her daughter-in-law to her sister on the pretence that the girl will have a nice steam bath in the bath house. The girl's aunt warns her that her mother-in-law's sister intends to burn her to death, but advises her to go anyway, with a few precautions. The girl walks through the field and ties a ribbon to a birch tree, then goes to the mother-in-law's sister. While she goes to prepare the bath, the girl greases the door hinges with oil, greases the shutters with pitch, gives meat to the dogs and fishes to the cat, and escapes. The mother-in-law's sister notices the girl's delay and goes to check on her, and finds out that she fled. The mother-in-law tries a last trick: she takes the daughter-in-law to the barn. The girl's aunt advises her to let the mother-in-law go ahead of her, and shove her down a shaft.

Karelia
Karelian scholarship locates 4 variants of tale type SUS 428 in Karelia, and report that some of its motifs combine with tale type SUS 705.

In a tale collected in 1964 and published in 1967, a couple has a son that they marry to a girl. Before she goes to her parents-in-law's house, she throws her ring in the lake and makes a vow not to say any word while under their roof. Time passes, and the mother-in-law sends the girl to the deep forest to shear some sheep. While the girl goes to fulfill the task, an old man tells her that there are no sheep, but wolves in the forest, so he teaches her how to proceed. Next, the mother-in-law sends the girl to shear the sheep again. The old man warns her that the bears will tear her apart, and advises her again. The third time, the mother-in-law sends the girl to her sister's house on the seashore and ask for an iron reed. The old man warns her that at the house on the seashore lives Yaga-baba or someone else, and gives her fishes, meat, grains, a brush and an egg. The girl meets her mother-in-law's sister and gets the reed while the witch goes to prepare a bath. Before the girl leaves, she oils the door hinges, gives meat to dogs and fishes to cat, and flees. The witch goes after her and the girl throws behind her the brush and the egg to hinder the pursuit. She then crosses a river with a tablecloth and arrives just in time to see her husband getting married to another woman.

Udmurt people
In a tale from the Udmurt people published by folklorist  with the title "Египеча" ("Egipecha"), an old widow named Egipecha lives with her son Ivan. The old woman wants her son to find a wife and has an idea: she sends her pigeons to fly beyond the seas and bring her a girl named Anna. The girl is leaving her house to fetch water when the birds fly in and take her to Egipecha. the old woman marries Anna to her son Ivan and they begin to live together. However, Egipecha begins to mistreat her daughter-in-law. One day, she orders Anna to shear their sheep and bring her their wool. Ivan intercepts Anna and warns her that the "sheep" are actually wolves and bears, and teaches her how to get their hair. Egipecha's next task is for Anna to go to her sister and bring her a бердом (reed for weaving). Ivan gives a piece of meat, a silk ribbon, a kalach, a needle, a water chestnut and a brush. Anna enters a dark forest and gives the meat to a dog, ties the silk ribbon to a birch tree, the needle to some tailors, and enters Egipecha's sister's house. She gives the kalach to her pet cat and asks Egipecha's sister for the reed. The old woman leaves the room for a while; the cat warns Anna to get the reed and escape. After Anna flees, Egipecha's sister chases after her, but the girl throws behind her the brush (which becomes a forest) and the water chestnut (which creates a lake between them). Egipecha's sister asks Anna how to traverse the lake, and the girl suggests she sails in a scarf. The old woman follows the instructions, swims to the middle of the lake and sinks. Anna goes back to Egipecha with the reed and tells that her sister drowned. Egipecha goes to the lake to save her and follows the same instructions. Egipecha drowns, Anna and Ivan are free to live their lives. The tale was originally published in 1948 by author A. Klabukov. The commentator, A. Zapadov, noted that Egipecha was the Udmurt version of the Russian character Baba-Yaga.

Other regions
Four variants are reported in Udorsky District, in the Komi Republic, and three of them show combinations with East Slavic type SUS 313H*, related to the international type ATU 313, "The Magic Flight".

The East Slavic Folktale Catalogue lists a single variant from Belarus, in the work of ethnographer . The tale was collected by Federowski from an informant named Taciana Pýtliczanka, with the title Ab wiedżmi jak syna żänila. In this tale, after the heroine escapes from the witch, the witch commands the doors, the dog, the cat and the geese to stop her.

See also
Prunella (AaTh 428)
 The Little Girl Sold with the Pears (AaTh 428)
 La Fada Morgana (AaTh 428)
 The Man and the Girl at the Underground Mansion (AaTh 428)
Cupid and Psyche
Graciosa and Percinet
The Green Serpent
The King of Love
Ulv Kongesøn (Prince Wolf)
The Golden Root
The Horse-Devil and the Witch
Tulisa, the Wood-Cutter's Daughter
 Khastakhumar and Bibinagar
 Habrmani
 The Son of the Ogress
 The Tale of the Woodcutter and his Daughters
 Yasmin and the Serpent Prince

References 

Russian fairy tales
Baba Yaga
Female characters in fairy tales
ATU 400-459